The New Radical is a 2017 documentary film that premiered at the Sundance Film Festival in the US Documentary Competition. In the film, uncompromising millennial radicals from the United States and the United Kingdom attack the system through dangerous technological means, which evolves into a high-stakes game with world authorities in the midst of a dramatically changing political landscape. The film contains an interview with Julian Assange at the Ecuadoran Embassy in London.

Critical response 
Owen Gleiberman writing for Variety said, "The great strength of The New Radical is that it's not on its subjects' side (or totally against them either). It's the rare documentary that lets you decide." Katie Walsh in the Los Angeles Times called the film's neutrality "irresponsible" and "problematic," chastising the filmmakers for not taking a side. Writing for RogerEbert.com, critic Glenn Kenny stated the work is a "scary movie about scary people that’s too much in bed with these people".

See also
 Crypto-anarchism
 WikiLeaks

References

External links
 

2017 films
Documentaries about politics
2010s English-language films